Ema Alivodić, née Ramusović (born 28 November 1996) is a Montenegrin handball player for CSM București and the Montenegrin national team.

She represented Montenegro at the 2014 European Women's Handball Championship in Hungary and Croatia where she scored 1 goal against Slovakia. Ema also scored 8 goals for Budućnost Podgorica in the 2014–15 EHF Women's Champions League.

Achievements
EHF Champions League:
Winner: 2015
Romanian Cup:
Winner: 2022
Romanian Supercup:
Finalist: 2021
Montenegrin Championship:
Winner: 2015, 2016, 2017, 2018, 2019, 2021
Montenegrin Cup:
Winner: 2015, 2016, 2017, 2018, 2019, 2020, 2021
Women's Regional Handball League:
Winner: 2015, 2016, 2019

Awards and recognition
 Handball-Planet.com World Young Female All-Star Team: 2015–16

References

External links

1996 births
Living people
Montenegrin female handball players
People from Berane
Handball players at the 2016 Summer Olympics
Handball players at the 2020 Summer Olympics
Olympic handball players of Montenegro